Walter Turner  was Dean of Ferns from 1569 to 1590.

Notes

16th-century Irish Anglican priests
Deans of Ferns